Automolis incensa is a moth of the family Erebidae. It was described by Francis Walker in 1864. It is found in South Africa.

References

Endemic moths of South Africa
Syntomini
Moths described in 1864
Erebid moths of Africa